Afrofuturist literature includes speculative works with African-American themes. Although the term became common in the 1990s, some scholars apply the genre to works that were written earlier, such as W. E. B. Du Bois's Darkwater: Voices from Within the Veil (1920) and Ralph Ellison's Invisible Man (1952). While Afrofuturism is most commonly associated with science fiction, it can also encompass other speculative genres such as fantasy, alternate history, and magic realism. Although the term, Afrofuturist, has been applied broadly to works by authors from Africa and the African diaspora, some African authors have rejected the term and prefer Africanfuturism as a description of their work.

List of Afrofuturist literature

References 

Afrofuturism